Alfred Weck (5 March 1915 – 9 July 1971) was a French racing cyclist. He rode in the 1936 Tour de France.

References

1915 births
1971 deaths
French male cyclists
Place of birth missing